A 2-in-1 PC, also known as convertible laptop, 2-in-1 tablet, 2-in-1 laptop, 2-in-1 detachable, laplet, tabtop, laptop tablet, or simply 2-in-1, is a portable computer that has features of both tablets and laptops.

Before the emergence of 2-in-1s and their denomination as such, technology journalists used the words convertible and hybrid to denominate pre-2-in-1 portable computers: Convertible typically denominated those that featured a mechanism to conceal the physical keyboard by sliding or rotating it behind the chassis, and hybrid those that featured a hot-pluggable, complementary, physical keyboard. Both pre-2-in-1 convertibles and hybrids were crossover devices that combined features of both tablets and laptops. The later 2-in-1 PCs comprise a category that is a sibling to both the pre-2-in-1 convertibles and hybrids. Models of 2-in-1 PC were each similarly denominated either a 2-in-1 convertible or 2-in-1 detachable, respectively, and despite borrowing the terminology of the pre-2-in-1 PCs, the two species of 2-in-1 PCs are distinct from the two species of pre-2-in-1 PCs because 2-in-1 PCs have additional features of traditional laptops.

2-in-1 PCs consist of portable computer components within light and thin chassis, and exemplify technological convergence. They are convenient for media consumption and non-intensive tasks in tablet mode yet useful for content production in laptop mode.

Form-factors

2-in-1 convertible 

2-in-1 convertibles are tablets with the ability to rotate, fold, or slide the keyboard behind the display. On most devices, the hinge is situated at the display and keyboard junction. However, the Dell XPS Duo is unique in that the display sits in a frame that allows the screen to be spun.

Netvertible 

Rotational-convertible format is where in addition to the conventional hinging action, the central single hinge mechanism is also able to rotate about a central axis perpendicular to the keyboard surface, such that the laptop can be turned into a thick tablet. Most netvertibles have the option to support active (electromagnetic) stylus and/or touch screen (resistive or capacitive), some being ruggedized such as Panasonic Toughbook CF series. Other examples include Toshiba Portege M7xx, Fujitsu LifeBook T series and HP EliteBook Revolve series.

2-in-1 detachable 

2-in-1 detachable are devices with detachable keyboards. In most cases, the keyboard part provides few, if any, additional features (most often a touchpad, as in the HP Spectre x2). However, the keyboards of some detachable provide additional features similar to those of a docking station such as additional I/O-ports and supplementary batteries. For instance, the Surface Book can leverage the discrete GPU in the keyboard upon the keyboard's connection.

When connected to the keyboard, the display of the detachable can either be free-standing on the hinge or require external support, often in the form of a kickstand. Novel ways of providing external support include the bending frame and locking mechanism of the HP Spectre x2.

Though the keyboard is usually bundled with the purchase of a 2-in-1 detachable, it is occasionally deemed an optional accessory by manufacturers in order to minimize the starting price of a device. In such cases the 2-in-1 detachable is often displayed with its complementary keyboard in advertisements and promotional materials. This is true for all devices of the Surface and Surface Pro lines.

Bluetooth/Detachable keyboard accessories 
Although not an typical laptop sizes, but due to both Smartphone/Phablet and Tablet hardware is getting more powerful, some third party accessories OEM had developed a keyboard accessories which allowed either though wireless connection or connection via the USB port to the handheld device that allowed it to work like an laptop.

Operating system such as Android even show the mouse cursor when connected to a mouse, where as Ubuntu Touch take it even further by allowing the user to modified the UI to an typical desktop mode with window which allowed desktop level multitasking, albeit with smaller screen.

Distinction from traditional tablets and laptops 

2-in-1s fall in the category of hybrid or convertible tablets but are distinct in that they run a full-featured desktop operating system and have I/O ports typically found on laptops, such as USB and DisplayPort. The most prominent element is the keyboard that allows the 2-in-1 to provide the ergonomic typing experience of a laptop.

While 2-in-1s fall in a category distinct from laptops, they loosely parallel the traits of the Ultrabook device category, having light and thin chassis, power-efficient CPUs, and long battery lives. They are distinguished from traditional Ultrabooks by the inclusion of a touchscreen display and a concealable or detachable keyboard.

Examples 

The earliest device that can be considered a 2-in-1 detachable is the Compaq Concerto from 1993. It came preinstalled with Windows 3.1 and Windows for Pen Computing, and had a cabled detachable keyboard, and battery powered stylus. In June 1994, IBM introduced the ThinkPad 360P, which features a display that can be rotated backwards and closed down into a pen-operated tablet.

Mainstream attention for 2-in-1 PCs was not achieved until nearly two decades later, when many manufactures showed devices, at that time referred to as "hybrid" devices, at CES 2011.  While Packard Bell, Acer and HP all had Microsoft Windows based 2-in-1s by 2011, Lenovo released the well reviewed Windows 2-in-1: The X220 Tablet variant of the ThinkPad X220, successor of 2010's ThinkPad X201 Tablet. The 12-inch device included a digital stylus housed within the chassis, somewhat ruggedized construction, and a multi-touch screen with a twist and fold hinge.

Microsoft started its own line of 2-in-1s with the introduction of the Surface Pro series, the first of which was released in February 2013. It had a 10.6-inch (27 cm) display, Intel Core i5 CPU, and included the Pro Pen stylus and a detachable keyboard that doubled as a protective screen cover. In 2015 Microsoft introduced the Surface Book series, which, similar to the Surface Pro series, features a detachable keyboard cover and Surface Pen stylus.

Samsung entered the 2-in-1 PC market with the release of the Windows-based Samsung Galaxy TabPro S, which was released in March 2016. It had a 12-inch display, Intel Core m3 CPU, a first-party keyboard attachment, and a TabPro Pen. Its successor, the Galaxy Book, was released in February 2017. Coming in a 10.6-inch model and a 12-inch model, the Galaxy Book has an improved detachable keyboard and include an S Pen.

Google entered the 2-in-1 market after it announced the Pixel Slate in October 2018. It runs on ChromeOS and features a 12.3-inch display. It includes two USB-C ports, but it omits the headphone jack. The featured Pixel Keyboard and Pixelbook Pen are sold separately.

Since 2012, a number of other prominent laptop manufacturers, such as Dell, Asus, and Sony have also begun releasing their own 2-in-1s.

While the iPad Pro has optional Smart Keyboard and Apple Pencil accessories, Apple has yet to release a true 2-in-1 PC in a detachable form-factor and with a similar desktop OS, citing the quote below.

Criticism 
In April 2012 Apple's CEO Tim Cook, answering to the question of the researcher Anthony Sacconaghi about a possible hybrid of iPad and MacBook, compared a 2-in-1 to a combination of "a toaster and a refrigerator" that "doesn’t please anyone":

2-in-1s are natively supported by the Microsoft Windows, and Google ChromeOS operating systems. Various other Linux distributions also support some touch features of 2-in-1s, though they are generally unsupported by hardware vendors.

See also 
 Tablet
 All-in-one PC

References 

Laptops
Tablet computers
Classes of computers
Classes of mobile computers
Personal computers
Crossover devices
2-in-1 PCs
American inventions